Squashed entanglement, also called CMI entanglement (CMI can be  pronounced "see me"), is an information theoretic measure of quantum entanglement for a bipartite quantum system.

where  is the set of all density matrices  for a tripartite system  such that . We define  , the quantum Conditional Mutual Information (CMI), below. A more general version of Eq.(1) replaces the ``min" (minimum) in Eq.(1) by an ``inf" (infimum). When  is a pure state, 
, in agreement with the definition of entanglement of formation for pure states. Here  is the Von Neumann entropy of density matrix .

Motivation for definition of CMI entanglement

CMI entanglement has its roots in classical (non-quantum) information theory, as we explain next.

Given any two random variables , classical information theory defines the mutual information, a measure of correlations, as

For three random variables , it defines the CMI as

It can be shown that .

Now suppose  is the density matrix for a tripartite system . For example, . One can define a quantum analogue of Eq.(2) by

and a quantum analogue of Eq.(3) by

It can be shown that . This inequality is often called the strong-subadditivity property of quantum entropy.

For those special  of the form

it can be shown that . Probability distributions of the form Eq.(6) are in fact described by the Bayesian network shown in Fig.1.

One can define a classical CMI entanglement by

where  is the set of all probability distributions  in three random variables , such that for all . Because, given a probability distribution , one can always extend it to a probability distribution  that satisfies Eq.(6), it follows that the classical CMI entanglement, is zero for all . We want a measure of quantum entanglement that vanishes in the classical regime.

It can be shown that the following density matrix

satisfies . Eq.(8) is the quantum counterpart of Eq.(6). Therefore,  given by Eq.(1) vanishes for all separable states.

When  is a pure state, one gets
. This
agrees with the definition of entanglement of formation for pure states, as given  in Ben96.

Let  be the set of density matrices defined previously for Eq.(1). It can be shown that if  we replace in Eq.(1) the set  by its proper subset , then Eq.(1) reduces to the definition of entanglement of formation for mixed states, as given in Ben96.  and  represent different degrees of knowledge as to how  was created.  represents total ignorance.

History

The important inequality  was first proved by Lieb and Ruskai in LR73.

Classical CMI, given by Eq.(3), first entered information theory lore, shortly after Shannon's seminal 1948 paper and at least as early as 1954 in McG54. The quantum CMI, given by Eq.(5), was first defined by Cerf and Adami in Cer96. However, it appears that Cerf and Adami did not realize the relation of CMI to entanglement or the possibility of obtaining a measure of quantum entanglement based on CMI; this can be inferred, for example, from a later paper, Cer97, where they try to use  instead of CMI to understand entanglement. The first paper to explicitly point out a connection between CMI and quantum entanglement appears to be Tuc99.

The final definition Eq.(1) of CMI entanglement was first given by Tucci in a series of 6 papers. (See, for example, Eq.(8) of Tuc02 and Eq.(42) of Tuc01a). In Tuc00b, he pointed out the classical probability motivation of Eq.(1), and its connection to the definitions of entanglement of formation for pure and mixed states. In Tuc01a, he presented an algorithm and computer program, based on the Arimoto-Blahut method of information theory, for calculating CMI entanglement numerically. In Tuc01b, he calculated CMI entanglement analytically, for a mixed state of two  qubits.

In Hay03, Hayden, Jozsa, Petz and Winter explored the connection between  quantum CMI and separability.

It was not however, until Chr03, that it was shown that CMI entanglement is in fact an entanglement measure, i.e. that it does not increase under Local Operations and Classical Communication (LOCC).  The proof adapted Ben96 arguments about entanglement of formation. In Chr03, they also proved many other interesting inequalities concerning CMI entanglement, including that it was additive, and explored its connection to other measures of entanglement.  The name squashed entanglement first appeared in Chr03.  In Chr05, Christandl and Winter calculated analytically the CMI entanglement of some interesting states.

In Ali03, Alicki and Fannes proved the continuity of CMI entanglement.  In BCY10, Brandao, Christandl and Yard showed that CMI entanglement is zero if and only if the state is separable. In Hua14, Huang proved that computing squashed entanglement is NP-hard.

References

Ali03 
BCY10 
Ben96 
Cer96 
Cer97 
Chr03 
Chr05 
Chr06  Cambridge PhD thesis.
Hay03 
Hua14 
LR73 Elliott H. Lieb, Mary Beth Ruskai, "Proof of the Strong Subadditivity of Quantum-Mechanical Entropy", Journal of Mathematical Physics 14 (1973) 1938-1941.
McG54 W.J. McGill, "Multivariate Information Transmission", IRE Trans. Info. Theory 4 (1954) 93-111.
Tuc99 
Tuc00a 
Tuc00b 
Tuc01a 
Tuc01b 
Tuc02

External links
 Faithful squashed entanglement

Quantum information science